Bhatiali or bhatiyali is a form of folk music in both Bangladesh and West Bengal. Bhatiali is a river song mostly sung by boatmen while going down streams of the river. The word bhatiyali comes from bhata meaning "ebb" or downstream.

It is mostly sung in several parts of greater riparian Bengal delta. Researchers have claimed Mymensingh District along the Brahmaputra River or the Bhati (lower region of a river) area as its place of origin. Bhaitaili lyrics traditionally consist of metaphorical and emotional verses about the waters and the situation of boatmen and fishermen. Among the 14 subjects of folk music in Bangladesh, that includes Deha-tatva (about the body)  and Murshid-tatva (about the guru), Bhatiali deals with Prakriti-tatva (about nature).

Notable collectors, composers and writers in the genre are Miraz Ali, Ukil Munshi, Rashid Uddin. Jalal Khan, Jang Bahadur, Shah Abdul Karim  and Umed Ali. Between the 1930s and 1950s, Bhatiali has seen its golden age, when most of these personalities were contributing to the genre. Singer Abbas Uddin made the genre popular singing "Amay bhashaili re, amay dubaili re" and other popular numbers. In the 2000s, Malay Ganguly and Bari Siddiki and Saurav Moni were three most prominent Bhatiali singers. Saurav Moni already sang lots of renowned song contributing to the genre. Some of his identical songs are as follows 

 Majhi Baiya Jao Re
 Sara Ratro Nouka Baiya
 Allah Megh De Pani de

See also
 Baul
 Bhati region
 Folk Music Festivals in Bangladesh

References

20th-century music genres
21st-century music genres
Bangladeshi music
Bengali music
Music of Bengal
Indian styles of music